Degrassi High is a Canadian television series created by Linda Schuyler and Kit Hood. The third series in the Degrassi franchise and a direct sequel to Degrassi Junior High, it aired on the CBC for two seasons from November 6, 1989 to February 28, 1991, and on PBS in the United States starting from January 13, 1990. A non-union production by Hood and Schuyler's company Playing With Time, Inc. Kate Taylor of WGBH served as an additional executive producer.

The series follows the same Toronto-based ensemble cast from the previous series, now having graduated to high school, as they face most of the same issues as its predecessor, except with the addition of more controversial and extreme issues and challenges, including abortion, cancer, death, suicide, and AIDS. Like the previous series, it was jointly produced by Hood and Schuyler's Playing With Time and Kate Taylor of WGBH-TV Boston, and was produced in association with the United States Corporation for Public Broadcasting with participation of Telefilm Canada. The school used in the series is the Centennial College campus in Toronto, Ontario, and like its predecessor, the series shot in and around the Greater Toronto Area.

The series premiered on CBC in the same 8:30.p.m Monday time slot as Junior High and continued its predecessor's critical and commercial success. A small controversy occurred in 1990 when PBS removed a scene featuring anti-abortion protesters from its premiere episode without the consent of the show's producers. It received six awards, including a Prix Jeunesse and four Chris Awards, and seven nominations, including for several actors. It officially concluded with the made-for-television movie School's Out, which aired on CBC on January 5, 1992, marking the end of the franchise's Degrassi Classic era, until the debut of Degrassi: The Next Generation on CTV nine years later.

Development

Concept and creation 
In November 1988, after the premiere of the third and final season of Degrassi Junior High, Linda Schuyler alluded to the potential of a high-school followup when discussing the direction of the franchise with the Montreal Gazette, although she was unsure if it would go forward It was decided to continue into high school as the actors were becoming older, which would also make way for more controversial topics, including abortion, which was addressed in the series premiere. According to Schuyler: "As the kids get older, the only way we can remain true to this age group is by growing with them. Therefore, the issues get more complex."

In the series finale of Degrassi Junior High, the titular school is destroyed in a fire. To keep the entire cast together, a creative decision was made to move the younger students displaced by the fire to the new school to join those that had already graduated. Conversely, the grade 7 students introduced in the third season of Degrassi Junior High were accelerated to grade 9 for an unspecified reason. To give the series a "harder-edged feel", several older characters were introduced. Reflecting the growing independence of the aging characters, Degrassi High began to give more focus to the characters' lives outside of school, with scenes taking place at nighttime, on the street, or at the characters' jobs. In contrast to Degrassi Junior High, in which the extras were still made known to the viewers, the newer series would include a team of "extra extras", who would simply appear for no other purpose than to fill the background.

Filming 
The series was filmed at the Centennial College campus on Carlaw Avenue in Toronto. The building, which was formerly a teacher's college, was previously used to hold auditions for Ida Makes a Movie, the first installment of the Degrassi franchise, in 1979. The building was chosen as despite being part of a college, it more closely resembled a high school. Other filming locations included the Rose Donut Shop on Carlaw Avenue, where character Michelle Accette briefly works after moving away from her conservative father. Filming ended on the series in October 1990.

Opening sequence 
The Degrassi High theme song is a reworking of that of Degrassi Junior High. Like the previous series, the theme was composed by Lewis Manne and Wendy Watson, and sung by Watson. The theme is transposed to A# major and follows the same structure and lyrical content as its predecessor, with optimistic lyrics such as "Everybody can succeed/In yourself you must believe/You better try at Degrassi High!". The opening sequence starts with a stop-motion sequence of an alarm clock sitting next to a group of textbooks, as a person gets up from the bed, takes the textbooks, and leaves.

It follows the same format as its predecessor, with various scenes of characters in and around the school, omitting individual cast credits. The opening sequence ends with a zooming shot of a girl's backside as the logo forms. The opening sequence also contains several scenes that were not seen in the series, including a scene in which a character finds his bike smeared with peanut butter. According to Kit Hood, the scene was removed as the actor had grown too much to be a believable bullying victim.

Set decoration 
According to Kathryn Ellis, "A Degrassi character's bedroom is the most telling set for that character". The bedroom of character Lucy Fernandez was made from drywall and located in the school library, with her bed being the same used in other character's bedrooms. The childhood bedroom of character Liz O'Rourke, seen in a dream sequence in an episode where the character struggles with memories of her childhood sexual abuse, was made to look "larger than life" to make the young Liz seem extremely small, with the walls being painted blue for a "cool, almost cold atmosphere". For the bedroom of character Arthur Kobalewscuy, various items from the previous series were re-used, as well as rock posters of the fictional group Gourmet Scum, to indicate that the character was maturing in his tastes.

End of the series 
While Degrassi continued to be in demand by the CBC, multiple factors, internally and externally, contributed to the end of the series in 1991. Kit Hood had become exhausted and frustrated by television work, having reluctantly agreed to the second season of Degrassi High "to please the network and fans", and the partnership between Hood and Schuyler, both creatively and personally, was deteriorating. According to Schuyler, when learning of the renewal, he accused Schuyler of manipulating him and head writer Yan Moore into doing "a year’s work that we don’t want to do". In addition, WGBH found it increasingly difficult to raise money from the PBS children's department as the show continued to age, and as a consequence were forced to withdraw their funding. 

Both Hood and Schuyler also chose to end the series because they felt the series had run its course and wanted it to end before it became stale and predictable. In a 1990 news interview, Schuyler explained that they wanted to end the series "while we were still feeling good about what we were doing", and that if they were to continue the series, they would have to "completely re-vamp it" and "bring in a new set of characters", something they did not want to do. Schuyler noted that most of the cast were occupied with post-secondary education, and that she felt the show had already tackled what they had aimed to. In a 1998 web interview with fan site owner Natalie Earl, Hood elaborated:

Schuyler informed CBC programming chief Ivan Fecan that they would not be able to produce any more of Degrassi High. Fecan enthusiastically accepted Schuyler's proposal to end the series with a feature-length film.

Episodes

Season 1 (1989–1990)

Season 2 (1990–1991)

Release

First-run broadcast 
Degrassi High premiered on November 6, 1989, on CBC with the two-part episode "A New Start", a week following the documentary Degrassi Between Takes. In the United States, the series debuted on January 14, 1990, on PBS. In Australia, it debuted on ABC TV on September 2, 1990. On the ABC, broadcasts of the series were preceded with a disclaimer that read: "Viewer Advice: The following episode of Degrassi High contains themes appropriate to a teenage audience. Some parents may consider it inappropriate for younger children". Re-runs aired on ABC-TV until 1995.

Post-broadcast distribution 
The series continued in re-runs on CBC during the late 1990s. On September 1, 1997, the series debuted on Showcase, where it aired back-to-back with Degrassi Junior High.

Home media 
The series was released on VHS by WGBH-TV Boston Home Video in the United States on March 7, 2000, both as separate tapes containing two episodes each and a full box set. It was later released as part of the Degrassi High: The Complete Collection DVD box set by WGBH on October 9, 2007, and the Degrassi High Collection set by Force Entertainment in Australia on March 12, 2008.

Reception and impact

Critical reception 
The series received a similar positive critical reaction to its predecessor for its realism and sincerity in dealing with adolescent issues, with many critics in particular acclaiming its premiere episode, A New Start, which centres on a student becoming pregnant and deciding to have an abortion. Writing for The Toronto Star, Antonia Zerbisias acclaimed the series premiere, asserting that it was "a gutsy show, particularly in the light of the current political and emotional climate [of the 1980s]", and singled out the exploration of both sides of the abortion topic. Furthermore, she quipped that if the show was an American prime time show, "the whole thing would turn out to be a hilarious mix-up. We'd have lots of eye-rolling, sophomoric one-liners about burgeoning bellies and then ooops! Turns out the smart alec kid brother merely murdered the bunny for a school science project." Writing for The Province, Lee Bacchus had mixed feelings about the debut. While feeling the show continued its predecessor's realism, Bacchus felt that it simplified the issue to "the bumper-sticker level of righteous moralism" and "lofty platitudes".

Writing for The Age, Margaret Geddes declared that the series gave Australian soap operas such as Neighbours and Home and Away "a run for their money", but unlike the "trite morality plays" she felt were pervasive in those shows, Degrassi High was more realistic and thoughtful. Furthermore, she noted a comparison between the series and the British series Grange Hill. Writing for The Los Angeles Times, Lynne Heffley declared that Degrassi High had proved itself to be one of the most "gutsiest shows on television". Profiling the show in the lead-up to the debut of its final season, Kelli Pryor of Entertainment Weekly called it the "thirtysomething of the book-bag set".

Censorship 
The series premiere was shown uncensored on CBC. In the United States, scenes of anti-abortion protesters were removed by PBS. Kate Taylor, co-producer of the series and of WGBH Educational Foundation, defended this as an "[a]esthetic decision" that made for a "more powerful, more poignant" ending. This was done without the permission of Playing With Time, the show's production company, with Kit Hood denouncing it as "an American ending -- happy, safe but incomplete" and requesting his name be removed from the PBS broadcast credits. Likewise, when the series re-ran on Noggin's teen block The N in 2005, A New Start was omitted, as well as the third episode Breaking Up Is Hard To Do, as it referenced the events of A New Start. When the episode "It Creeps!", which centres around several students shooting a horror movie in the school, aired on ABC-TV in Australia in 1991, various scenes depicting graphic violence were removed. When the episode was shown again unedited on ABC2 on March 28, 2009, two viewers complained.

Notes

References 

Sources
 
 

High
Television series about bullying
CBC Television original programming
1989 Canadian television series debuts
1991 Canadian television series endings
Canadian television soap operas
1980s Canadian high school television series
1990s Canadian high school television series
Television shows set in Toronto
Television shows filmed in Toronto
Sequel television series
1980s Canadian teen drama television series
1990s Canadian teen drama television series
Television series by DHX Media
1980s Canadian LGBT-related drama television series
1990s Canadian LGBT-related drama television series
Television series about teenagers
Fictional high schools
Coming-of-age television shows